De wereld rond (English: Around the World) is the sixth studio album by the Belgian girlgroup K3. The album was released on 6 September 2004 through label Studio 100. Three singles were released to promote the album: "Liefdeskapitein", "Superhero" and "Zou er iemand zijn op Mars?". The album reached the peak position in the Dutch album chart. In 2009, a reissue of the album was released, which contains the original songs as well as karaoke versions of the songs.

Track listing

Chart performance

Weekly charts

Year-end charts

Certifications

References

2004 albums
K3 (band) albums